On the Eiffel Tower, 72 names of French scientists, engineers, and mathematicians are engraved in recognition of their contributions. Gustave Eiffel chose this "invocation of science" because of his concern over the protests against the tower. The engraving was painted over at the beginning of the 20th century and restored in 1986–87 by Société Nouvelle d'exploitation de la Tour Eiffel, the company that the city of Paris contracts to operate the Tower. The repainting of 2010–11 restored the letters to their original gold colour. There are also names of the engineers who helped build the Tower and design its architecture on a plaque on the top of the Tower, where a laboratory was built as well.

List

Location 
The list is split in four parts (for each side of the tower). The sides have been named after the parts of Paris that each side faces:
 The North-East side (also known as La Bourdonnais side)

 The South-East side (also known as the Military School side)

 The South-West side (also known as the Grenelle side)

 The North West side (also known as the Trocadéro side)

Names 
In the table below are all the names on the four sides.

Criticism

Women 
The list contains no women. The list has been criticized for excluding the name of Sophie Germain, a noted French mathematician whose work on the theory of elasticity was used in the construction of the tower itself. In 1913, John Augustine Zahm suggested that Germain was excluded because she was a woman.

Hydraulic engineers and scholars 
Fourteen hydraulic engineers and scholars are listed on the Eiffel Tower. Eiffel acknowledged most of the leading scientists in the field. Henri Philibert Gaspard Darcy is missing; some of his work did not come into wide use until the 20th century. Also missing are Antoine Chézy, who was less famous; Joseph Valentin Boussinesq, who was  early in his career at the time; and mathematician Évariste Galois.

Notes

References

Further reading
 Reprinted as

External links

Paris streets named for the 72 scientists

Eiffel
72 names on the Eiffel Tower
Eiffel Tower hall of fame

Eiffel Tower
Eiffel Tower list
Eiffel Tower
Eiffel Tower